The Radio Equipment Directive 2022/2380 is a directive of the European Union which became law in 2022, succeeding Radio Equipment Directive 2014/53 and 2012/0283.

The directive mandates the use of USB-C as a universal charger for smartphones by the end of 2024, and laptops by 2026. Apple intends to limit the functionality of non-Apple USB-C cables with Apple products.

It is considered a successor to the common external power supply (2009-2014), a voluntary specification which used micro-USB as a standard connector.

References

External links
Directive 2022/2380 text

European Union directives
2022 in the European Union